Keo Saphal  is a Cambodian politician. He belongs to Funcinpec and was elected to represent Takeo Province in the National Assembly of Cambodia in 2003.

References

Members of the National Assembly (Cambodia)
Living people
Year of birth missing (living people)
FUNCINPEC politicians